Ivan Lendl was the defending champion, but lost in the second round to Cristiano Caratti.

Alexander Volkov won the title by defeating Caratti 6–1, 7–5 in the final.

Seeds

Draw

Finals

Top half

Bottom half

References

External links
 Official results archive (ATP)
 Official results archive (ITF)

Milan Indoor
Milan Indoor
Milan Indoor